Taiwan's participation in the World Health Organization was as an observer in the World Health Assembly from 2009 to 2016, under the designation "Chinese Taipei". China, which claims Taiwan as its own territory, blocked it from participating in the assembly following the election of pro-Taiwanese independence Tsai Ing-wen as President in 2016. Due to Taiwan’s successful response to the COVID-19 pandemic, its inclusion in the WHO gained international attention in 2020, with strong support from the United States, Japan, Germany and Australia.

Background 

Ever since United Nations General Assembly Resolution 2758 recognising the People's Republic of China (PRC) as "the only legitimate representative of China to the United Nations" and removing "the representatives of Chiang Kai-shek" from the United Nations, Taiwan lost its UN seat and the PRC has blocked it from participation in UN-affiliated entities.

COVID-19 pandemic 

On December 31, 2019, Taiwan’s government expressed concerns to the World Health Organization (WHO) about the virus’s potential for human-to-human transmission, but received no reply. The WHO instead endorsed China’s denial of human-to-human transmission until January 21, when China confirmed it. Having experienced the 2002–2004 SARS outbreak, Taiwan immediately adopted vigorous measures for screening, testing, contact tracing, and enforcing quarantines, in what was widely considered a successful pandemic response.

In February 2020, Taiwan became more vocal about its exclusion from World Health Organization meetings.

In a April 2020 interview, Assistant Director-General Bruce Aylward appeared to dodge a question from RTHK reporter Yvonne Tong about Taiwan's response to the pandemic and inclusion in the WHO, saying he couldn't hear her and asking to move to another question. When the video chat was restarted, he was asked another question about Taiwan. He responded by indicating that they had already discussed China and formally ended the interview. The incident led to accusations about the PRC's political influence over the international organization.

In May 2020, Taiwan rejected China's main condition for it to be able to part of the World Health Organization, that it accept that is part of China.

See also  
China and the United Nations
Political status of Taiwan
United Nations General Assembly Resolution 2758

References 

Taiwan
World Health Organization
COVID-19